No Limite 3 was the third season of the Brazilian reality show No Limite filmed at Marajó Island, Pará, Brazil. The premiere aired Sunday, 28 October 2001.

Twelve contestants were chosen by the producers to participate on the show between October and November 2001. The two initial tribes were Água (Water) and Fogo (Fire). On episode 6, the two teams merged into a tribe called Foguágua, named for a combination of the two tribes.

On the season finale, the second-to-last immunity challenge divided the players in two teams. The winning team (Hérica and Tatiana) advanced to the finals, while the losing team (Adriana and Peterson) was automatically eliminated.

However, the last six eliminated players before the final two (Cláudia, Diuare, Fábio, Rodrigo, Peterson and Adriana) returned to compete in a special challenge. The winning player (Rodrigo) returned to the game as the third and final member of the Final Three.

The Final Three faced off in a final immunity challenge, which was an extremely grueling, multi-part challenge, and the most elaborate challenge of the entire season, often combining elements from previous challenges.

Weeks later, on 23 December 2001, live from Rio de Janeiro, police officer Rodrigo Trigueiro was announced as the winner of the competition, winning R$300,000 and a brand new car. Runner-up triathlete and model Hérica Sanfelice won R$50,000, and the third-place finisher, student Tatiana Welikson, won R$25,000.

Contestants

The Total Votes is the number of votes a castaway has received during Tribal Councils where the castaway is eligible to be voted out of the game. Doesn't count jury votes.

The game

Voting history

External links
 No Limite on Gshow.com

2001 Brazilian television seasons
No Limite seasons